Thado Minsaw was a Burmese royal title and may refer to:

 Thado Minsaw of Prome:  Founder of Prome Kingdom (r. 1482–1526)
 Thado Minsaw of Ava:  Viceroy of Ava (r. 1555–1584)
 Hsinbyushin:  King of Burma (r. 1763–1776)
 Thado Minsaw:  Crown Prince of Burma (r. 1783–1808)

Burmese royal titles